These are the official results of the Women's High Jump event at the 1996 Summer Olympics in Atlanta, Georgia. There were a total of 32 participating athletes, with two non-starters. The qualification round mark was set at 1.93 metres.

Medalists

Results

Qualifying round
Qualification: Qualifying Performance 1.96 (Q) or at least 12 best performers (q) advance to the final.

Final

 * In May 1996, Antonella Bevilacqua twice tested positive for ephedrine which carried the penalty of a three-month ban. The IAAF decided to put the case to arbitration and allow her to compete in Atlanta, where she placed 4th. However, after the Olympics the IAAF decided she was  guilty of a doping offence and annulled her results from May onwards, including her Olympic performance.

See also
 National champions high jump (women)
 1995 Women's World Championships High Jump
 1997 Women's World Championships High Jump

References

External links
 Official Report
 Results

H
High jump at the Olympics
1996 in women's athletics
Women's events at the 1996 Summer Olympics